Euderces is a genus of longhorn beetles, family Cerambycidae. They are found in South, Central, and North America, with the centre of diversity in southern Mexico and Guatemala.

Many members of this New World genus are ant mimics. E. velutinus is a tropical species closely resembling the common ant species Camponotus sericeiventris. Most species are smaller than 5 mm.

Distribution
Four species of this genus occur in the United States.

Species

References

 BioLib.cz: Genus Euderces

External links
 Pictures of E. reichei — in vivo
 Picture of E. picipes — in vivo

 
Tillomorphini
Cerambycidae genera
Taxa named by John Lawrence LeConte